All Hallows School is a non-selective co-educational prep school that provides day and boarding facilities. A Christian School in the Catholic tradition the school accepts children from all faiths and none. The school is located a mile east of Cranmore village, near the town of Frome, Somerset, in the West of England. An ISI inspection in July 2014 rated all areas of the school as 'Excellent', the highest possible rating.

History
All Hallows was founded as a boys' school in 1938 by Francis Dix but not at the current location. Shortly after World War II, the school moved into the Grade II* listed Cranmore Hall — the former home of Sir Richard and Lady Paget — which had been used as a maternity hospital during the war.

The school became co-educational in 1971. In 2006 the school acquired a new modern classroom block, the Crane Wing. The name of Cranmore derives from Crane's Mere — the original name for the area based upon the name of the bird and the former wetlands it inhabited. In 2007 an extension to the reception classroom was built. A Creative Centre was opened in 2014 for Art, Creative Design and Photography.

Curriculum
Junior pupils follow the International Primary Curriculum (IPC) and senior pupils study for ISEB 13+ Common Entrance Examinations or Scholarship. Languages studied include French, Spanish and Latin. Also included: sport, music, drama, art, creative design and Forest School / Outdoor Education.

Boarding
Boarding is available for students with the dormitories located in the main Manor House. Boys and girls board on different landings, with dormitories arranged by age. There are a mix of full and flexi-boarders, and regular age-appropriate activities are held to keep children entertained in the evening.

Houses
The school has four houses for inter-house competition and fund raising projects.  The houses are named after local villages:
Batcombe 
Cranmore 
Downhead 
Wanstrow

Head Teachers 
 Francis Dix 1938–1964
 Alistair Mortimer 1964–1971
 Paul Ketterer 1971–1994
 Christopher Bird 1994–2005
 Ian Murphy 2005–2014
 Annie Lee 2015–2017
 Trevor Richards 2017–Present

Notable alumni
 Auberon Waugh

References

External links
 School website
 Profile on the ISC website
 Profile on the IAPS website
 Profile on the Good Schools Guide
 ISI Inspection Reports

Preparatory schools in Somerset
Boarding schools in Somerset
Roman Catholic private schools in the Diocese of Clifton
Educational institutions established in 1938
1938 establishments in England
Catholic boarding schools in England
Grade II* listed buildings in Mendip District
Grade II* listed houses in Somerset